Karl Wendell Wilson (born September 10, 1964) is a former American football defensive lineman in the National Football League for eight different teams. He played college football at Louisiana State University.

With Dallas Cowboys left tackle Erik Williams, Wilson appeared on the cover of the video game Madden NFL '95, albeit with his shirt number changed to the unused number 70.

References

1964 births
Living people
American football defensive linemen
San Diego Chargers players
Phoenix Cardinals players
Miami Dolphins players
Los Angeles Rams players
New York Jets players
San Francisco 49ers players
Tampa Bay Buccaneers players
Buffalo Bills players
LSU Tigers football players
People from Amite City, Louisiana